Ugandan Argus was daily print newspaper and magazine in Uganda, published in Kampala by the Uganda Argus Limited.

The newspaper was founded in 1955, seven years before Uganda achieved independence from the British colonial government in 1962. In 1971 it became the New Vision Newspaper.

References 

1955 establishments
Newspapers published in Uganda
Daily newspapers published in Uganda
Publications established in 1955
1955 establishments in Uganda
Mass media in Kampala